Shamans is the seventh album by the Azeri jazz artist Aziza Mustafa Zadeh, released in 2002. In the liner notes, Zadeh left a comment about each song. The artwork contains a number of paintings by her. Around 2,000,000 copies of this album were sold worldwide.

Track listing
 "Holiday Blessings" – 4:30
Life is the greatest gift of God
 "Ladies Of Azerbaijan" – 5:00
...are gentle but proud
 "UV" (Unutma Vijdani) – 5:48
About conscience
 "Sweet Sadness" – 4:59
For loving hearts
 "M25" – 2:58
...is the largest car park in the world
 "Ayrilik" – 4:56
Dedicated to the memory of the beautiful Turkish singer, Zeki Müren
 "Fire Worship" – 4:34
Fire as the symbol of life
 "Shamans" – 9:10
...are very special people, gifted by God... they can see who you are, and heal you in many ways
 "Strange Mood" – 5:26
Dedicated to the genius of Vagif Mustafa Zadeh
 "Uzun Ince Bir Yoldayim" – 4:13
My favourite Turkish song
 "Endless Power" – 3:43
...of Vagif's spirit that has tremendous influence on me
 "Melancholic Princess" – 4:20
Waiting for the prince of her life...
 "Bach-Zadeh" – 2:56
Bach is my first classical composer. As Vagif said, "great jazzman"
 "Portrait Of Chopin" – 5:36
My first romantic composer. Like my father, he was only thirty-nine when he died.

Notes
 "UV" lyrics inspired by Aliagha Vahid
 "Ayrilik" lyrics written by Hodjaty Nariman
 "Uzun Ince bir Yoldayim" is a Turkish folk music song written by Aşık Veysel
 "Bach-Zadeh" and "Portrait of Chopin" inspired by J.S. Bach and Chopin
 Cricket in "Shamans": Jo

2002 albums
Aziza Mustafa Zadeh albums